Jeff Drost is a former defensive tackle in the National Football League.

Biography
Drost was born Jeffrey Wayne Drost on January 27, 1964 in San Angelo, Texas.
For the 2022 season he is an assistant football coach at Roosevelt High School in Des Moines, Iowa for the Roughriders.

Career
Drost was drafted in the eighth round of the 1987 NFL Draft by the Green Bay Packers and played that season with the team. He played at the collegiate level at the University of Iowa.

See also

List of Green Bay Packers players

References

People from San Angelo, Texas
Green Bay Packers players
American football defensive tackles
University of Iowa alumni
Iowa Hawkeyes football players
1964 births
Living people